The cercles of Mali are divided into arrondissements. These are further divided into 703 communes, 19 urban and 684 rural. Unlike communes or cercles, arrondissements have no administrative power or elected officials: they are merely territorial divisions or used to divide administrative duties.  Often the borders of communes and arrondissements coincide, rendering the arrondissement demarcation of the territory superfluous.

The arrondissements are listed below, by region and cercle:

Bamako Capital District
 No Arrondissements: Six numbered Urban Communes

Gao Region

Ansongo Cercle
Ansongo
Bara
Bourra
Ouattagouna
Talataye
Tessit
Tin Hama

Bourem Cercle
Bamba
Bourem
Taboye
Tarkint
Temera

Gao Cercle
Anchawadi
Gabero
Gao
Gounzoureye
N'Tillit
Soni Ali Ber
Tilemsi

Menaka Cercle
Alata
Anderamboukane
Inekar
Menaka
Tidermene

Kayes Region

Bafoulabe Cercle
Bafoulabe
Bamafele
Diakon
Diallan
Diokeli
Gounfan
Kontela
Koundian
Mahina
Niambia
Oualia
Sidibela
Tomora

Diema Cercle
Bema
Diangounte Camara
Dianguirde
Diema
Dieoura
Dioumara Koussata
Fassoudebe
Fatao
Gomitradougou
Groumera
Guedebine
Lakamane
Lambidou
Madiga-Sacko
Sansankide

Kita Cercle
Badia
Bendougouba
Benkadi Founia
Boudofo
Bougaribaya
Dindenko
Djidian
Djougoun
Gadougou 1
Gadougou 2
Guemoukouraba
Kassaro
Kita
Kita Nord
Kita Ouest
Kobri
Kokofata
Kotouba
Koulou
Kourounnikoto
Madina
Makano
Namala Guimba
Niantanso
Saboula
Sebekoro
Sefeto Nord
Sefeto Ouest
Senko
Sirakoro
Souransan-Tomoto
Tambaga
Toukoto

Kenieba Cercle
Baye
Dabia
Dialafara
Dombia
Falea
Faraba
Guenegore
Kassama
Kenieba
Kouroukoto
Sagalo
Sitakily

Kayes Cercle
Bangassi
Diamou
Djelebou
Faleme
Fegui
Gory Gopela
Goumera
Guidimakan Keri Kaffo
Hawa Dembaya
Kabate
Karakoro
Kayes
Kemene Tambo
Khouloum
Koniakary
Koussane
Liberte Dembaya
Logo
Marena Diombougou
Marintoumania
Sadiola
Sahel
Same Diongoma
Segala
Sero Diamanou
Somankidi
Sony
Tafacirga

Nioro du Sahel Cercle
Baniere Koré
Diabigué
Diarra
Diaye Coura
Gavinane
Gogui
Guetema
Kadiaba Kadiel
Korera Kore
Nioro Du Sahel
Nioro Tougouné Rangabes
Sandaré
Simbi
Trougounbé
Yéréré
Youri

Yélimané Cercle
Diafoumou Diongaga
Diafoumou Gory
Fanga
Gory
Guidime
Kirane Kaniaga
Konsiga
Kremis
Marekhaffo
Soumpou
Toya
Tringa

Kidal Region

Abeibara Cercle
Abeibara
Boghassa
Tinzawatene

Kidal Cercle
Anefif
Essouk
Kidal

Tin-Essako Cercle
Intadjedite
Tin-Essako

Tessalit Cercle
Adjelhoc
Tessalit
Timtaghene

Koulikoro Region

Banamba Cercle
Banamba
Benkadi
Boron
Duguwolowula
Kiban
Madina Sacko
Sebete
Toubacoro
Toukoroba

Dioila Cercle
Banco
Benkadi
Binko
Degnekoro
Diebe
Diedougou
Diouman
Dolendougou
Guegneka
Jekafo
Kaladougou
Kemekafo
Kerela
Kilidougou
Massigui
Nangola
N'Dlondougou
N'Garadougou
N'Golobougou
Niantjila
Tenindougou
Wacoro
Zan Coulibaly

Kangaba Cercle
Balan Bakana
Benkadi
Kaniogo
Karan
Maramandougou
Minidian
Narena
Nouga
Selefougou

Koulikoro Cercle
Dinandougou
Doumba
Koula
Koulikoro
Meguetan
Nyamina
Sirakorola
Tienfala
Tougouni

Kolokani Cercle
Djidieni
Guihoyo
Kolokani
Massantola
Nonkon
Nonssombougou
Ouolodo
Sagabala
Sebekoro 1
Tioribougou

Kati Cercle
Baguineda Camp
Bancoumana
Bossofala
Bougoula
Daban
Diago
Dialakoroba
Dialakorodji
Diedougou
Dio-Gare
Dogodouman
Dombila
Doubabougou
Faraba
Kalabancoro
Kalifabougou
Kambila
Kati
Kourouba
Mande
Moribabougou
Mountougoula
Ngabacoro Droit
N'Gouraba
Niagadina
Nioumamakana
N'Tjiba
Ouelessebougou
Safo
Sanankoro Djitoumou
Sanankoroba
Sangarebougou
Siby
Sobra
Tiakadougou Dialakoro
Tiele
Yelekebougou

Nara Cercle
Allahina
Dabo
Dilly
Dogofry
Fallou
Gueneibe
Guire
Koronga
Nara
Niamana
Ouagadou

Mopti Region

Bandiagara Cercle
Bandiagara
Bara Sara
Borko
Dandoli
Diamnati
Dogani Bere
Doucoumbo
Dourou
Kende
Kendie
Lowol Gueou
Metoumou
Ondougou
Pelou
Pignari
Pignari Bana
Sangha
Segue Ire
Soroly
Timiri
Wadouba

Bankass Cercle
Bankass
Baye
Diallassagou
Dimbal Habbe
Kani Bonzon
Koulogon Habbe
Lessagou Habbe
Ouenkoro
Segue
Sokoura
Soubala
Tori

Djenné Cercle
Dandougou Fakala
Derary
Djenne
Fakala
Femaye
Kewa
Madiama
Nema-Badeya-Kafo
Niansanari
Ouro Ali
Pondori
Togue Mourari

Douentza Cercle
Dallah
Dangol-Bore
Debere
Dianvely
Djaptodji
Douentza
Gandamia
Haire
Hombori
Kerena
Korarou
Koubelwel Koundia
Mondoro
Petaka
Tedie

Koro Cercle
Bamba
Barapireli
Bondo
Diankabou
Dinangourou
Dioungani
Dougoutene I
Dougoutene II
Kassa
Koporo Pen
Koporokendie Na
Koro
Madougou
Pel Maoude
Yoro
Youdiou

Mopti Cercle
Bassirou
Borondougou
Konna
Korombana
Koubaye
Kounari
Mopti
Ouro-Modi
Ouroube Doude
Sasalbe
Soye
Socoura
Sio

Tenenkou Cercle
Dialloube
Diafarabe
Diaka
Diondori
Kareri
Ouro Ardo
Ouro-Guire
Sougoulbe
Tenenkou
Togoro-Kotia
Toguere-Coumbe

Youwarou Cercle
Fatoma
Bimbere Tama
Deboye
Dirma
Dongo
Farimake
N'Dodjiga
Youwarou

Ségou Region

Bla Cercle
Beguene
Bla
Diaramana
Diena
Dougouolo
Falo
Fani
Kazangasso
Kemeni
Korodougou
Koulandougou
Niala
Samabogo
Somasso
Tiemena
Touna
Yangasso

Barouéli Cercle
Baraoueli
Boidie
Dougoufie
Gouendo
Kalake
Konobougou
N'Gassola
Sanando
Somo
Tamani
Tesserela

Macina Cercle
Boky Were
Folomana
Kokry
Kolongo
Macina
Matomo
Nonimpebougou
Saloba
Sana
Souleye
Tongue

Niono Cercle
Diabaly
Dogofry
Kala Siguida
Mariko
Nampalari
Niono
Pogo
Siribala
Sirifila Boundy
Sokolo
Toridaga-Ko
Yeredon Saniona

Ségou Cercle
Baguindadougou
Bellen
Boussin
Cinzana
Diedougou
Diganibougou
Dioro
Diouna
Dougabougou
Farako
Farakou Massa
Fatine
Kamiandougou
Katiena
Konodimini
Markala
Massala
N'Gara
N'Koumandougou
Pelengana
Sakoiba
Sama Foulala
Samine
Sansanding
Sebougou
Segou
Sibila
Soignebougou
Souba
Togou

San Cercle
Baramandougou
Dah
Diakourouna
Dieli
Djeguena
Fion
Kaniegue
Karaba
Kassorola
Kava
Moribila
N'Goa
Niamana
Niasso
N'Torosso
Ouolon
San
Siadougou
Somo
Sourountouna
Sy
Tene
Teneni
Tourakolomba
Waky

Tominian Cercle
Benena
Diora
Fangasso
Koula
Lanfiala
Mafoune
Mandiakuy
Ouan
Sanekuy
Timissa
Tominian
Yasso

Sikasso Region

Bougouni Cercle
Bladie-Tiemala
Bougouni
Danou
Debelin
Defina
Dogo
Domba
Faradiele
Faragouaran
Garalo
Keleya
Kokele
Kola
Koumantou
Kouroulamini
Meridiela
Ouroun
Sanso
Sibirila
Sido
Syen Toula
Teimala Banimonotie
Wola
Yinindougou
Yiridougou
Zantiebougou

Kolondieba Cercle
Bougoula
Fakola
Farako
Kadiana
Kebila
Kolondieba
Kolosso
Mena
Nangalasso
N'Golodiana
Tiongui
Tousseguela

Kadiolo Cercle
Diou
Dioumatene
Fourou
Kadiolo
Kai
Loulouni
Misseni
Nimbougou
Zegoua

Koutiala Cercle
Diedougou
Diouradougou Kafo
Fagui
Fakolo
Gouadji Kao
Goudie Sougouna
Kafo Faboli
Kapala
Karangouana Malle
Kolonigue
Konigue
Konina
Konseguela
Koromo
Kouniana
Koutiala
Logouana
Miena
M'Pessoba
Nafanga
Nampe
N'Golonianasso
N'Gountjina
Niantaga
N'Tossoni
Sincina
Sinkolo
Songo Doubakore
Songoua
Sorobasso
Tao
Yognogo
Zanfigue
Zangasso et arrondissement
Zaniena
Zebala

Sikasso Cercle
Benkadi
Blendio
Danderesso
Dembela
Dialakoro
Diomatene
Dogoni
Doumanaba
Fama
Farakala
Finkolo
Finkolo Ganadougou
Gongasso
Kabarasso
Kaboila
Kafouziela
Kapala
Kapolondougou
Kignan
Klela
Kofan
Kolokoba
Koumankou
Kouoro
Kourouma
Lobougoula
Miniko
Miria
Missirikoro
Natien
Niena
Nongo-Souala
N'Tjikouna
Pimperna
Sanzana
Sikasso
Sokourani-Missirikoro
Tella
Tiankadi
Wateni
Zanferebougou
Zangaradougou
Zaniena

Yanfolila Cercle
Baya
Bolo Fouta
Djallon Foula
Djiguiya De Koloni
Gouanan
Gouandiaka
Koussan
Sankarani
Sere Moussa Ani Samou De Siekorole
Tagandougou
Wassoulou Balle
Yallankoro Soloba

Yorosso Cercle
Boura
Karangana
Kiffosso
Koumbia
Koury
Mahou
Menamba
Ourikela
Yorosso

Tombouctou Region

Diré Cercle
Arham
Binga
Bourem Sidi Amar
Dangha
Dire
Garbakoira
Haibongo
Kirchamba
Kondi
Sareyamou
Tienkour
Tindirma
Tinguereguif

Goundam Cercle
Adarmalane
Alzounoub
Bintagoungou
Douekire
Doukouria
Essakane
Gargando
Goundam
Issa Bery
Kaneye
M'Bouna
Razelma
Tele
Tilemsi
Tin-Aicha
Tonka

Gourma-Rharous Cercle
Bambara Maoude
Banikane
Gossi
Hamzakoma
Haribomo
Inadiatafane
Ouinerden
Rharous
Serere

Niafunke Cercle
Banikane Narhawa
Dianke
Fittouga
Koumaira
Lere
N'Gorkou
Soboundou
Soumpi

Timbuktu Cercle
Alafia
Ber
Bourem Inaly
Lafia
Salam
Tombouctou

See also
Regions of Mali
Cercles of Mali
Communes of Mali

References

Notes

Regions, Cercles and Places in Mali, African Development Information Services Database. Contains listing of Arrondissements under each Cercle page.

 
Subdivisions of Mali
Mali, Arrondissements
Mali 3
Districts, Mali
Mali geography-related lists